The Pikauba River is a tributary of Kenogami Lake, flowing in the province of Quebec in Canada, in the administrative regions of:
 Capitale-Nationale: in the unorganized territory of Lac-Pikauba, in the Charlevoix Regional County Municipality;
 Saguenay-Lac-Saint-Jean: in the unorganized territory of Lac-Ministuk, in the Le Fjord-du-Saguenay Regional County Municipality.

This river crosses the Laurentides Wildlife Reserve. The Pikauba River Valley is mainly accessible via the route 169 and the route 175 (connecting Quebec (city) and Chicoutimi). Other secondary forest roads have been developed in the area for forestry and recreational tourism activities.

The Pikauba River and Pikauba Lake have enjoyed a considerable reputation among hunters and fishermen since the end of the 19th century. Throughout the region, trout abounded and caribou hunting was once very popular.

The surface of the Pikauba River is usually frozen from late November to early April, however safe circulation on the ice is generally from mid-December to late March.

Geography 
The Pikauba River is one of the most important rivers between Quebec (city) and Saguenay (city). Bordered by steep mountains, its narrow course is dotted with rapids and has several falls; it widens downstream, rich in the waters of its drainage basin which includes the Apica, Écorces, Pika and Petite Pikauba rivers. Increasingly tumultuous, it flows into the western part of Kenogami Lake.

The Pikauba River originates at the dike at the southeast mouth of Pikauba Lake which has another outlet, the Cyriac River; this other mouth is located at the bottom of a bay on the north shore. This lake is located in the central part of the Laurentides Wildlife Reserve. This lake has a narrowing generating a strait of a hundred meters in width demarcating the northern part of the lake. The mouth of the south-east of the lake flowing into the Pikauba river is located at:
  north-east of route 175 connecting the towns of Quebec (city) and Saguenay (city);
  south-east of the junction of roads route 175 and route 169;
  south-west of the dam at the mouth of Lake Ha! Ha!;
  south-east of the Portage-des-Roches dam located at the mouth of Kenogami Lake;
  south-east of the confluence of the Pikauba river and Kenogami Lake;
  south-east of the confluence of the Chicoutimi River and the Saguenay River, that is to the downtown of Saguenay (city).

Upper course of the Pikauba river (segment of )

  south-west to the outlet (coming from the south) of lakes Jupiter, Violon and Général Tremblay, corresponding to a bend of the river located near route 175;
  towards the south-east along the route 175, up to Philippe stream (coming from the northeast);
  south along route 175, passing under the bridge of this last route, to a bend in the river;
  towards the north-west in a deep valley, until the stream of Hell (coming from the south);
  towards the northwest by collecting the Pies stream (coming from the south), to the Black stream (coming from the west);

Intermediate course of the Pikauba river, downstream from the ruisseau Noir (segment of )

  north-west, then north, to the outlet of Davenport Lake;
  towards the northwest by meandering, until the Croche stream (coming from the east);
  westward, to Leboeuf stream (coming from the south);
  towards the north-west, more or less along route 169, to the Ovide stream (coming from the northeast);
  towards the northwest by meandering, up to Tremblay stream (coming from the southeast);
  north-west to a bend in the river, then west along the Félix stream, to the confluence of the Apica River (coming from South);

Intermediate course of the Pikauba river, downstream of the Apica river (segment of )

  towards the northwest in a deep valley forming a small hook towards the east at the end of the segment, up to Damasse stream (coming from the east);
  towards the northwest by winding up to the Pika River (coming from the south);
  to the north, taking the Angers arm up to the confluence of the Petite Pikauba River (coming from the east);

Lower course of the Pikauba river (segment of )

  towards the north by collecting the Dominus stream (coming from the west) at the start of the segment, then by collecting the Sauce stream (coming from the southwest), up to the stream at La Joke (coming from the northeast) whose confluence is located downstream from a bend in the river;
  north-west until the confluence of the Rivière aux Écorces (coming from the south);
  towards the northwest, up to ruisseau L'Abbé (coming from the southeast);
  towards the northeast by forming a W at the end of the segment, up to the Gagnon stream (coming from the southeast);
  towards the northwest, bending towards the northeast by going around a mountain, to its mouth.

This confluence of the Pikauba river is located at:
  west of the entrance to Épiphane Bay which is on the north shore of the lake;
  west of the confluence of the Cyriac River and Kenogami Lake;
  west of route 175;
  south-west of the Portage-des-Roches dam;
  southwest of downtown in the Jonquière sector of the city of Saguenay (city);
  south-west of the confluence of the rivière aux Sables and Saguenay River;
  south-west of the confluence of the Chicoutimi River and the Saguenay River.

Toponymy 
The specific "Pikauba" designates two rivers and a lake in the "Laurentian wildlife reserve". Father Laure's 1731 map identifies this watercourse "Ouapikoupau river". According to Father Joseph-Étienne Guinard, in the Innu and Cree languages in particular, there is the "pikobaw" form that Father Laure translates from the Innu language as "tightened or masked by rushes". Another source claims rather that "pikobaw" breaks down into "pik", meaning "menu", "kobaw" meaning "scrub" and "wabi" meaning "white"; thus, this translation generates “white brush” or “small brush”.

In 1981, the Commission de toponymie du Québec adopted a change in the designation of this watercourse. Maps from 1900 to 1930 refer to the hydronyms "Grande Rivière Pikauba" and Petite Rivière Pikauba. The place names "Chicoutimi" and "Pikauba" officially replaced them in 1940. More recently, usage has confirmed that the part of the river south of Kenogami Lake is called "Pikauba river" and its tributary, that of “Petite rivière Pikauba”.

The toponym "Pikauba river" was formalized on January 8, 1981, at the Place Names Bank of the Commission de toponymie du Québec.

Notes and references

Appendices

Related articles 
 Charlevoix Regional County Municipality
 Le Fjord-du-Saguenay Regional County Municipality
 Lac-Pikauba, a TNO
 Lac-Ministuk, a TNO
 Saguenay River, a stream
 Chicoutimi River, a stream
 Pikauba Lake, a body of water
 Kenogami Lake, a body of water
 Rivière aux Écorces, a watercourse
 Pika River, a stream
 Apica River, a stream
 Little Pikauba River, a stream
 List of rivers of Quebec

Rivers of Saguenay–Lac-Saint-Jean
Le Fjord-du-Saguenay Regional County Municipality
Rivers of Capitale-Nationale
Charlevoix Regional County Municipality